Dobler is a surname. Notable people with the surname include:

 Alfons Dobler (1947–2008), Austrian football manager
 Bruce Dobler (1939–2010), American writer
 Conrad Dobler  (1950-2023), American football player
 Henri Dobler (1863–1941), Swiss art collector, painter, and art critic
 Jonas Dobler (born 1991), German cross-country skier
 Kaitlyn Dobler (born 2002), American swimmer
 Konrad Dobler (born 1957), German long distance runner
 Patricia Dobler (1939–2004), American poet
 Rolf Dobler (born 1967), Swiss handball player
 Walter Dobler (1919–1995), American football player

Fictional characters
 Lloyd Dobler, character in the film Say Anything...